East Tytherley is a small village in Hampshire, England.

The name Tytherley comes from Old English and means thin or tender wood.

The village was given to Queen Philippa by her husband Edward III in 1335. When the Black Death spread through London she moved her court to the village.

The village church is St Peter’s. It is largely dates from the 13th cenurty with a heavy restoration between 1862 and 1863. A Tower on the north side was completed in 1898 

In more recent history William Fothergill Cooke invented the first commercial electrical telegraph whilst living in the village.

See also
Queenwood College

References

External links

Villages in Hampshire